Deion Belue (born September 3, 1991) is a former American football cornerback. He played college football at Alabama. Belue signed with the Miami Dolphins as an undrafted free agent in 2014.

He was also a member of the Pittsburgh Steelers.

He coached at Deshler as the Secondary Coach.

As of 2021, Deion accepted a coaching job at Sheffield, Alabama.

Early years
Belue attended Deshler High School in Tuscumbia, Alabama. He was selected to the Alabama Sports Writers Association 4A All-State team twice while in high school. He recorded 70 tackles as a junior in 2008 with four interceptions, two in which returned for touchdowns. He also returned two punts and one kickoff for touchdowns while hauling in over 800 yards receiving and five touchdowns.

Considered a three-star recruit by Rivals.com, he was rated as the 82nd best cornerback prospect in the nation.

College career
Belue spent the previous two seasons at Northeast Mississippi Community College before transferring to Alabama. Belue was selected to the NJCAA's 2011 All-American list during sophomore season.  He was selected to the second-team NJCAA All-American team following the 2011 season. In his first season at Alabama, he started all 14 totaling 40 tackles (6.5 for loss), two interceptions and a fumble return (57 yards) for a touchdown. Belue also broke up seven passes and forced a fumble. As a senior in 2013, he started 11 games recording 20 tackles, three pass break ups and one interception.

Professional career

Miami Dolphins
On May 12, 2014, he signed with the Miami Dolphins as an undrafted free agent. He was waived on May 25, 2014.

Pittsburgh Steelers
Belue was signed by the Pittsburgh Steelers on May 29, 2014.

Jacksonville Jaguars
On July 23, 2014, Belue was signed by the Jacksonville Jaguars. On August 25, 2014, Belue was released.

Edmonton Eskimos
On June 1, 2015 Belue signed with the Edmonton Eskimos of the Canadian Football League.

References

External links
Alabama Crimson Tide bio
Miami Dolphins bio
Pittsburgh Steelers bio
Jacksonville Jaguars bio

1991 births
Living people
African-American players of American football
African-American players of Canadian football
Alabama Crimson Tide football players
American football cornerbacks
Canadian football defensive backs
Edmonton Elks players
Jacksonville Jaguars players
Miami Dolphins players
Northeast Mississippi Tigers football players
People from Tuscumbia, Alabama
Pittsburgh Steelers players
Players of American football from Alabama
21st-century African-American sportspeople